Culicoides annettae is a species of Culicoides. It is found in Central America.

References

annettae